The Rio Fuerte beaded lizard (Heloderma exasperatum) is a venomous species of beaded lizard in the family Helodermatidae. It is found in the tropical forests and shrublands of western Mexico, specifically around the Rio Fuerte and Rio Mayo basins. It is often found in or near abandoned mammal burrows and sources of water.

Geographic range

Description
As an adult, the Rio Fuerte beaded lizard ranges from 60 to 90 cm (23.6 to 35.4 in) in total length (including tail). It can weigh up to 4 kg (8.8 lb). It is very similar to the Mexican beaded lizard in appearance and size.

Diet
H. exasperatum feeds mainly on reptile eggs, but also eats bird eggs, and nestlings of birds and mammals.

Reproduction
H. exasperatum is oviparous.

Taxonomy
The Rio Fuerte beaded lizard is a member of the family Helodermatidae. The species was formerly considered a subspecies of the Mexican beaded lizard, which is its closest living relative, but was elevated to full species status in 2013.

Etymology
The generic name, Heloderma, means "studded skin", from the Ancient Greek words hêlos (ηλος), meaning "the head of a nail or stud", and derma (δερμα), meaning "skin".

The specific name, exasperatum, means "completely rough" in Latin.

References

Further reading
Bogert CM, Martín del Campo R (1956). "The Gila Monster and its Allies: The Relationships, Habits, and Behavior of the Lizards of the Family Helodermatidae". Bulletin of the American Museum of Natural History 109: 1–238. (Heloderma horridum exasperatum, new subspecies, pp. 28–32).

Helodermatidae
Endemic reptiles of Mexico
Sonoran–Sinaloan transition subtropical dry forest
Venomous lizards
Lizards of North America
Reptiles described in 1956